Wilmorite Properties, Inc is a commercial real estate company based in Chili, New York, a suburb of Rochester, New York.

A subsidiary of the company owes significant back taxes and fees to the City of Rochester resulting from a loan and tax agreement surrounding the failed development of the Sibley Building.

The company manages Eastview Mall, The Mall at Greece Ridge, The Marketplace Mall, and Pittsford Plaza, all of which are in Rochester.

History
James P. Wilmot founded the company in the 1940s and since then, Wilmorite has developed retail, office, hotel, and residential real estate.

In 1967, Wilmorite built Greece Towne Mall (now The Mall at Greece Ridge), one of the first enclosed regional malls in New York State. In 1969, Wilmorite opened Long Ridge Mall and combined Greece Towne Mall and Long Ridge Mall in 1994, renaming it The Mall at Greece Ridge Center, dropping "Center" in 2006.

In 2005, the majority of the assets of the company were acquired by Macerich.

Notable former properties
 Camillus Mall
 Charlestowne Mall
 Danbury Fair Mall
 Fairmount Fair
 Fayetteville Mall
 Freehold Raceway Mall
 Great Northern Mall
 Irondequoit Mall
 Mohawk Mall
 Penn-Can Mall
 Rotterdam Square
 Shoppingtown Mall
 Sibley Building
 Tysons Corner Center
 Westshore Mall
 Wilton Mall at Saratoga
 Park Point at RIT

References

External links
Official Website

Real estate companies of the United States
Companies based in Monroe County, New York
Macerich
1940s establishments in New York (state)
2005 mergers and acquisitions